Christian Constantin (born 7 January 1957) is a Swiss architect. He is the owner and president of Swiss football club FC Sion. He bought the club, which had previously neared bankruptcy and was relegated from the Swiss Super League, in 2003.

During his ownership of FC Sion, Constantin has employed over forty head coaches and incurred a transfer ban from FIFA due to the signing of Essam El-Hadary. This transfer ban then led to the club being expelled from the 2011–12 UEFA Europa League as players signed during the transfer embargo were used in competition. Yet under his presidency, the club also experienced considerable success, such as its Swiss Cup victories in 2006, 2009, 2011 and 2015.

Constantin was formerly a goalkeeper who played for Neuchâtel Xamax (1977–1979), FC Lugano (1979–1980), FC Monthey (1981–1982) and FC Martigny-Sports (1983–1984).

On 12 October 2017, Constantin was given a 14-month ban for striking former Switzerland coach Rolf Fringer.

In March 2020, Constantin sacked 9 of his FC Sion first-team players after they refused to take a pay cut after the outbreak of the coronavirus and suspension of the Swiss Super League.

References

External links 
  

1957 births
Living people
People from Martigny
Swiss men's footballers
Association football goalkeepers
Neuchâtel Xamax FCS players
FC Monthey players
FC Lugano players
FC Martigny-Sports players
Swiss architects
Swiss football managers
Swiss football chairmen and investors
FC Sion managers
Sportspeople from Valais